The Grassy Mountain Coal Project was a proposed open-pit steelmaking coal mine located on a previously abandoned mine site near Crowsnest Pass, Alberta, Canada. The project was denied by the Alberta Energy Regulator and the Canadian federal government, on the grounds of significant adverse environmental effects. The project was a flashpoint for widespread public outcry against coal mining in the eastern slopes of the Rocky Mountains.

Background 
Alberta has a long history of coal mining, stretching back to the mid 1870s, and mining was vital to Crowsnest Pass throughout the 20th century. The last mine in the area closed in 1983.

In 2013, Benga Mining acquired the Grassy Mountain property and coal leases from Devon Canada and Consol of Canada who had a 50/50 joint venture. In November 2015, Benda submitted an environmental impact assessment to the Alberta Energy Regulator and the Canadian Environmental Assessment Agency. In August 2016, an updated environmental impact assessment was lodged, and in October 2017 an integrated application was submitted to the AER.

In August 2018, the Minister for Environment and Climate Change and the Chief Executive Officer of the Alberta Energy Regulator announced an agreement to establish a joint review panel for the project, which enabled the Alberta Energy Regulator and the Impact Assessment Agency of Canada to jointly review the project proposal. The joint review panel published its report in June 2021.

Project proposal 
The Grassy Mountain Coal Project was proposed as an open-pit metallurgical coal mine covering 6918 acres. It was expected to produce 4.5 million tonnes of processed coal per year, with an expected lifespan of 25 years. The proposal was put forth by Benga Mining Limited, a subsidiary of Riversdale Resources Limited, an Australian company. The steelmaking coal would have been primarily destined for export to India and China. Steve Mallyon, managing director of Riversdale Resources, stated the justification for the project was based on the expected economic benefits from foreign investment, with commitments to customers in Asia and Europe.

Public response 
The proposed steelmaking coal mine generated widespread public condemnation on the basis of environmental and cultural concern. It gained notoriety among the public after local country music artist Corb Lund spoke out against it in beginning in January 2021. Lund continued to lead the public opposition, via social media and a protest concert featuring local landowners in June 2021. In October 2021, Lund released the song “This Is My Prairie,” a collaboration with other prominent Alberta artists including Terri Clark and Brett Kissel, which detailed the importance of the natural environment of Southern Alberta and specifically criticized coal mining in the eastern slopes.

Opponents to the project included ranchers, landowners, Indigenous groups, environmentalists, and others. A Leger poll conducted in 2021 determined that 77% of Albertans were concerned about the environmental impact that coal mining would have on rivers, and 58% believed that the economic benefits would not outweigh the environmental damage. In communities across Alberta, numerous lawn signs decrying coal mining and supporting the protection of clean water were placed in the yards of Alberta residents. Eight Alberta municipalities formally expressed concerns about coal mining in the eastern slopes, including Lethbridge, Turner Valley, High Level, Okotoks, and Canmore.

Shortly after the joint review panel decision was published, hundreds of residents from the Crowsnest Pass area gathered to express their disappointment.

First nations 
Local first nations, including Siksika and Kainai Nation, expressed opposition to coal mining in the Rocky Mountains and launched a legal challenge against the revocation of the 1976 coal policy. They cited the importance of Crowsnest Mountain as a sacred cultural site, and the danger to species such as grizzly bears, big horn sheep, bull trout, and elk, as well as the watersheds of the Oldman and Livingstone Rivers. However, they did not specifically oppose the Grassy Mountain Coal Project. Siksika Nation was willing to support this project on the basis of meaningful consultation, but opposed any future coal mining applications. A nearby coal project at Tent Mountain resulted in the decline of positive relations between another coal company, Montem Resources, and the Kainai and Siksika First Nations. In letters filed with the Impact Assessment Agency of Canada, Kainai and Siksika stated Montem's consultations to be transactional and not meaningful.

Environmental assessments 
In June 2021, the Alberta Energy Regulator denied Benga Mining's application for the Grassy Mountain Coal Project due to environmental impact. On August 6, 2021, the projected was rejected by Minister of the Environment Jonathan Wilkinson on the basis of the Canadian federal government's environmental assessment. According to subsections 5(1) and 5(2) of the Canadian Environmental Assessment Act 2012, it was determined that the project was “likely to cause significant adverse environmental effects,” which were not justified under the circumstances. The assessment cited concerns for surface water quality, the impacts on key species such as the westslope cutthroat trout, the whitebark pine, and the little brown bat, and the loss of lands used for traditional activities by the Kainai, Piikani, and Siksika First Nations. Similar coal projects nearby in British Columbia were found to have resulted in excessive fish deaths due to increased selenium in the water supply, resulting in a $1.4 million fine for Teck Resources.

Ongoing contention 
According to Alberta law, the costs of expert testimony, legal advice, and research incurred by citizens appearing before regulators are supposed to be paid by the project proponents. On 23 December 2021, the Alberta Energy Regulator issued a costs order totalling $868,874.31.

The Eastern Slopes Protection Act was introduced in the Alberta Legislature by Rachel Notley, leader of the official opposition party, in April 2021. As of February 2022, the Act has not yet passed.

References 

Environmental justice
Coal mines in Canada